Florynka  (Fliorynka) is a village in southern Poland, in the commune of Grybów, Nowy Sącz County, Lesser Poland Voivodeship.

History
 1785 – 745 Greek Catholics, 10 Roman Catholics, the village lands comprised 20.22 km2
 1840 – 992 Greek Catholics
 1859 – 1205 Greek Catholics
 1879 – 928 Greek Catholics
 1899 – 1150 Greek Catholics
 1926 – 1108 Greek Catholics
 1936 – 228 Greek Catholics – village switched to Orthodoxy, afterwards there were 1246 Orthodox, 57 Roman Catholics and 37 Jews

Florynka was the place of origin of the short-lived Lemko-Rusyn Republic from 1918 to 1920. The village was incorporated into the Lemko Apostolic Administration in 1934.

The Lemko inhabitants of the village were removed in Operation Vistula in 1947, and scattered to 30 different villages in 6 counties.

Church 
The Saint Michael Church was built in 1875 and survived to this day. The village Vafka 3 km away was served by the priest Florynka.

Notable people from Florynka 
Emil Czyrniański (1824–1888), chemist
Walery Jaworski (1849–1924), physician

References

Villages in Nowy Sącz County
Lemko Region